U mojoj sobi (Serbian Latin: In My Room) is a second studio album by Serbian pop singer Aleksandra Kovač. It was released in 2009.

The album contains 11 songs, out of which one is sung in Spanish, and one in English language. All the songs off the album produced Aleksandra Kovač herself.

Track list 
 "To je to" — 3:47
 "Hoka hej" — 3:16
 "Heroj" — 3:15
 "Nedostaješ mi" — 4:28
 "Opet sam tu" — 3:53
 "U jednoj sekundi" — 3:37
 "Halo?" — 3:45
 "Cuando No Estas Aqui" — 3:25
 "U mojoj sobi" — 3:46
 "Remembering Love" — 3:20
 "Da li nekad sanjaš san..." — 3:27

References

External links 
 Official Website of Aleksandra Kovač
 On: www.discogs.com

2009 albums
Aleksandra Kovač albums
Komuna (company) albums